Vladimir Vasilievich Krishtopa (born April 6, 1973) is a Ukrainian-born Russian murderer and rapist.

Crimes

First murder
On June 17, 1995, Krishtopa, in a state of intoxication, attacked a woman on the staircase between the 6th and 7th floors of the No. 70 House on Orbitalnaya Street in Rostov-on-Don. The woman was raped by him, and then severely beaten. As a result of the beating, she died from a closed craniocerebral injury.

Second murder 
A month later, on July 21, Krishtopa, again intoxicated, committed another murder, raping the woman before strangling her. He then stole her cassette player without the headphones.

Third murder attempt
Krishtopa did not commit any more crimes until August 3, when he was detained for attempting to kill a third woman. During the search, authorities found the audio player, which served as a crucial evidence.

On March 21, 1996, the Rostov Regional Court judge Mikhail Rebrov sentenced Vladimir Krishtopa to execution by firing squad. But soon, a moratorium was imposed on its application, and the criminal who was already on death row in Novocherkassk was resentenced to 25 years in prison. When Krishtopa was in cell number 117 of the Novocherkassk prison, his neighbor was notorious serial killer Vladimir Mukhankin. Subsequently, while giving an interview to the television program "Criminal Russia", Mukhankin told the following:

Krishtopa is also suspected of committing crimes in his native Ukraine before moving to Rostov.

In the media 
 A look from the inside. Russian Psychiatrist (1996).
 The 2005 episode of Russian documentary TV series "Profession Reporter", titled "Birth of a Maniac", features an interview with Krishtopa.

See also
 List of Russian serial killers

References

External links 
 Full transcript of the verdict by the Rostov Regional Court against citizen Vladimir Vasilievich Krishtopa. Accessed December 6, 2012 

1973 births
Living people
People from Rostov-on-Don
Prisoners sentenced to death by Russia
Suspected serial killers
Ukrainian people convicted of murder
Ukrainian prisoners sentenced to death
Ukrainian rapists
Violence against women in Russia